HD 164604 b is an extrasolar planet discovered in January 2010 in association with the Magellan Planet Search Program. It has a minimum mass 2.7 times the mass of Jupiter and an orbital period of 606.4 days. Its star is classified as a K2 V dwarf and is roughly 124 light-years away from Earth.

HD 164604 b is named Caleuche. The name was selected in the NameExoWorlds campaign by Chile, during the 100th anniversary of the IAU. Caleuche is a large ghost ship from southern Chilean mythology which sails the seas around the island of Chiloé at night.

An astrometric measurement of the planet's inclination and true mass was published in 2022 as part of Gaia DR3.

See also
 HD 129445 b
 HD 152079 b
 HD 175167 b
 HD 86226 b

References 

Exoplanets discovered in 2009
Exoplanets detected by radial velocity
Exoplanets detected by astrometry
Giant planets
Sagittarius (constellation)
Exoplanets with proper names